Paborita are Filipino disc-shaped biscuits with a flaky texture. They are made with wheat flour, sugar, skim milk, salt, baking powder, alum, and cooking oil. They are very similar in taste to galletas de patatas. They are traditionally eaten paired with hot drinks or with fruit preserves.

See also
Galletas de patatas
Broas
Galletas del Carmen
Roscas

References 

Philippine pastries
Biscuits